Hillfoots RFC is a Scottish rugby union club based in Tillicoultry, Clackmannanshire. The club plays its home games at the Public Park in Tillicoultry

History 

Hillfoots currently play in the Caledonia League Division 1. They run two senior XVs plus a veterans team.

Three of its most famous players John Manson, Danny Herrington and Bob Cairney formed a front row called the 'Tillicoultry Troglodytes'. All three went on to play for Dundee HSFP.

The club was awarded the Scottish Rugby Union's club of the month award in 2013. They received a grant to install floodlights in their home ground.

Notable former players

Scotland internationalists

The following former Hillfoots players have represented Scotland at full international level.

North and Midlands

The following former Hillfoots players have represented North and Midlands at provincial level.

Caledonia Reds players

The following former Hillfoots players have represented Caledonia Reds at professional level.

Honours

 Caledonia Division 2 Midland League
 Winners (1): 2017-198

References 

Scottish rugby union teams
Rugby clubs established in 1880
Tillicoultry
Rugby union in Clackmannanshire